Schütz (also spelled Schuetz without Umlaut ü) is a German surname, deriving from Schütze (shooter/marksman). Notable people with the surname include:

People
 Alfred Schütz (1899–1959), sociologist and philosopher
 Antal Schütz (1880-1953), Hungarian piarist monk and prominent theologian
 Caspar Schütz (1540–1594), German historian
 Christian Gottfried Schütz (1747–1832), German humanist scholar
 Christoph Schütz (1689–1750), German pietist writer and songbook publisher
 David Schütz (born 1941), Israeli writer
 Felix Schütz (born 1987), German ice hockey player
 Franz Schütz (1900–1955), German footballer
 Friedrich Schütz (1844–1908), Austrian journalist
 Günther Schütz (1912–1991), German military intelligence (Abwehr) agent during World War II
 Heinrich Schütz (1585–1672), German composer and organist
 Ignaz Schütz (1867–1927), Czech–German mathematician and physicist
 Johan Christher Schütz, Swedish songwriter and music producer
 Josef Schütz, or Schuetz, (born 1921), Lithuanian-German Nazi concentration camp guard
 Katharina Schütz (later Katharina Zell; 1497–1562), German Protestant apologist
 Klaus Schütz (1926-2012), German Social Democratic Party (SPD) politician
 Michael Schütz (musician) (born 1963), German church musician
 Morgan Schuetz (born 1994), All-American middle-distance runner
 Tales Schütz (born 1981), Polish football striker of German and Brazilian descent
 Tom Schütz (born 1988), German footballer
 Udo Schütz (born 1937), German entrepreneur and former race car driver
 Guillermo Schütz (born 1980), Mexican sports announcer

Other
 4134 Schütz, a main-belt asteroid named after Heinrich Schütz

See also 
 Schütze
 Schutz
 Šics

German-language surnames
Occupational surnames